Arlene Hunt (born 1972 in Dublin) is an Irish novelist.

Bibliography
Arlene Hunt has written seven crime novels: Vicious Circle (2004), False Intentions (2005), Black Sheep (2006), Missing Presumed Dead (2007), Undertow (2008), Blood Money (2010), and The Chosen (2011). Undertow was nominated for Best Crime Novel at the 2009 Irish Book Awards.

References

1972 births
Living people
Irish women novelists
Writers from Dublin (city)